Maurice Blackburn Lawyers, (formerly Maurice Blackburn & Co and Maurice Blackburn Cashman), was founded in 1919 by Maurice Blackburn. The firm is an Australian plaintiff law firm, having represented clients in a number of high-profile cases since its establishment.

Major cases 
Since its establishment Maurice Blackburn Lawyers have acted in a number of cases, including:
 The 40-Hour Working Week Case - in conjunction with the Australian Council of Trade Unions (ACTU) Maurice Blackburn fought for shorter working hours;
 MUA Waterfront Dispute Case - represented maritime workers against the Commonwealth Government during the waterfront dispute in 1998;
 The GIO Class Action - the first shareholder class action win in Australian legal history;
 Centro Class Action - the biggest shareholder class action settlement in legal history;
 Black Saturday bushfires Class Actions - collectively the largest class action settlement in Australian history at $794 million ($494 million in the Kinglake class action and $300 million in the Marysville class action); 
 Mohammed Haneef Case - defended Dr. Haneef against false charges of terrorism in 2010 and later acted on his behalf in a defamation matter;
 The Gene Patent BRCA1 Case - a ruling that saw the High Court rule that a mutated gene that causes cancer cannot be subject to a patent under Australian law.

Former staff

Maurice McRae Blackburn, Firm Founder, Former Labor MP and Former Independent Labor MP
Bill Shorten, Opposition Leader and Federal Labor MP
Nicola Roxon, Former Commonwealth Attorney-General and Federal Labor MP
Terri Butler, Federal Labor MP
Anika Wells, Federal Labor MP
Peter Cashman, Barrister and Academic at the University of Sydney
Eugene Arocca
Bill Slater, Australian politician and founder of the law firm Slater and Gordon Lawyers.
Murray Watt, Australian Labor Senator and Former Queensland Labor MP 
Justice Bernard Murphy, Justice of the Federal Court of Australia
John Button, Former Labor Senator for Victoria
John Cain, Former Victorian Government Solicitor

References

External links
 Maurice Blackburn: Official website

Law firms of Australia
Australian labour movement
Law firms established in 1919